Steyskalomyza is a monotypic genus of flies from the family Dryomyzidae.

Distribution
Known only from Japan in the Palearctic.

Species
S. hasegawai Kurahashi, 1982

References

Dryomyzidae
Insects of Japan
Monotypic Brachycera genera
Sciomyzoidea genera